The 2009–10 Houston Rockets season was the 43rd season of the franchise in the National Basketball Association (NBA). The news broke in the off-season when center Yao Ming would miss the upcoming season due to foot surgery. This injury would soon be considered career-threatening. Mid-season, All-Star Tracy McGrady, who was working his way back from knee surgery that kept him out of last season, was traded to the New York Knicks. Despite losing two All-Stars, the Rockets finished 42–40, but did not clinch a playoff spot.

Key dates
June 25 – The 2009 NBA draft took place in New York City.
July 8 – The free agency period started.

Summary

NBA Draft 2009

Free agency

Draft picks

Roster

Roster Notes
Center Yao Ming missed the entire season due to an left foot injury.

Pre-season

Regular season

Standings

Record vs. opponents

Game log

|- bgcolor="#ffcccc"
| 1
| October 27
| @ Portland
| 
| Aaron Brooks (19)
| Hayes, LandryAndersen (5)
| Kyle Lowry (8)
| Rose Garden20403
| 0-1
|- bgcolor="#bbffbb"
| 2
| October 28
| @ Golden State
| 
| Trevor Ariza (25)
| Luis Scola (11)
| Aaron Brooks (12)
| Oracle Arena19596
| 1-1 
|- bgcolor="#bbffbb"
| 3
| October 31
| Portland
| 
| Trevor Ariza (33)
| Luis Scola (6)
| Aaron Brooks (8)
| Toyota Center18100
| 2-1

|- bgcolor="bbffbb"
| 4
| November 2
| @ Utah
| 
| Aaron Brooks (19)
| Luis Scola (15)
| Aaron Brooks (9)
| EnergySolutions Arena19911
| 3-1
|- bgcolor="#ffcccc"
| 5
| November 4
| LA Lakers
| 
| Carl Landry (20)
| Chuck Hayes (14)
| Aaron Brooks (6)
| Toyota Center18291
| 3-2
|- bgcolor="#bbffbb"
| 6
| November 6
| Oklahoma City
| 
| Trevor Ariza (21)
| Luis Scola (10)
| Kyle Lowry (8)
| Toyota Center14911
| 4-2
|- bgcolor="#ffcccc"
| 7
| November 10
| @ Dallas
| 
| Aaron Brooks (22)
| Chase Budinger (9)
| Kyle Lowry (5)
| American Airlines Center19720
| 4-3
|- bgcolor="#bbffbb"
| 8
| November 11
| Memphis
| 
| Luis Scola (22)
| Luis Scola (15)
| Kyle Lowry (10)
| Toyota Center17220
| 5-3
|- bgcolor="#ffcccc"
| 9
| November 13
| @ Sacramento
| 
| Trevor Ariza (28)
| Luis Scola (9)
| Ariza, Brooks (5)
| ARCO Arena11762
| 5-4
|- bgcolor="#bbffbb"
| 10
| November 15
| @ LA Lakers
| 
| Aaron Brooks (33)
| Landry, Scola (9)
| Kyle Lowry (8)
| Staples Center18977
| 6-4
|- bgcolor="#ffcccc"
| 11
| November 17
| Phoenix
| 
| Carl Landry (27)
| Carl Landry (9)
| Aaron Brooks (13)
| Toyota Center16396
| 6-5
|- bgcolor="#bbffbb"
| 12
| November 18
| @ Minnesota
| 
| Luis Scola (20)
| Luis Scola (16)
| Shane Battier (5)
| Target Center11137
| 7-5 
|- bgcolor="#ffcccc"
| 13
| November 20
| @ Atlanta
| 
| Luis Scola (17)
| Luis Scola (10)
| Kyle Lowry (7)
| Philips Arena16674
| 7-6
|- bgcolor="#bbffbb"
| 14
| November 21
| Sacramento
| 
| Luis Scola (22)
| Luis Scola (12)
| Kyle Lowry (8)
| Toyota Center16202
| 8-6
|- bgcolor="#ffcccc"
| 15
| November 25
| Dallas
| 
| Carl Landry (24)
| Scola, Hayes (7)
| Kyle Lowry (7)
| Toyota Center18157
| 8-7
|- bgcolor="#ffcccc"
| 16
| November 27
| San Antonio
| 
| Luis Scola (18)
| Luis Scola (12)
| Trevor Ariza (5)
| Toyota Center18164
| 8-8
|- bgcolor="#bbffbb"
| 17
| November 29
| @ Oklahoma City
| 
| Brooks, Landry (21)
| Carl Landry (10)
| Aaron Brooks (4)
| Ford Center18203
| 9-8

|- bgcolor="#bbffbb"
| 18
| December 2
| @ LA Clippers
| 
| Aaron Brooks (22)
| Luis Scola (7)
| Aaron Brooks (5)
| Staples Center13836
| 10-8
|- bgcolor="#bbffbb"
| 19
| December 3
| @ Golden State
| 
| Aaron Brooks (25)
| Luis Scola (13)
| Aaron Brooks (7)
| Oracle Arena16432
| 11-8
|- bgcolor="#ffcccc"
| 20
| December 5
| @ Portland
| 
| Carl Landry (23)
| Carl Landry (9)
| Aaron Brooks (5)
| Rose Garden20555
| 11-9
|- bgcolor="#bbffbb"
| 21
| December 9
| Cleveland
| 
| Aaron Brooks (27)
| Luis Scola (10)
| Aaron Brooks (6)
| Toyota Center18200
| 12-9
|- bgcolor="#bbffbb"
| 22
| December 11
| @ Philadelphia
| 
| Carl Landry (20)
| Trevor Ariza (12)
| Trevor Ariza (3)
| Wachovia Center13991
| 13-9
|- bgcolor="#ffcccc"
| 23
| December 13
| @ Toronto
| 
| Carl Landry (25)
| Luis Scola (15)
| Aaron Brooks (4)
| Air Canada Centre17111
| 13-10
|- bgcolor="#bbffbb"
| 24
| December 15
| Detroit
| 
| Brooks, Scola (23) 
| Chase Budinger (12)
| Aaron Brooks (10)
| Toyota Center14899
| 14-10
|- bgcolor="#ffcccc"
| 25
| December 16
| @ Denver
| 
| Aaron Brooks (23)
| David Andersen (9)
| Aaron Brooks (7)
| Pepsi Center15753
| 14-11
|- bgcolor="#bbffbb"
| 26
| December 18
| @ Dallas
| 
| Kyle Lowry (26)
| Luis Scola (10)
| Kyle Lowry (10)
| American Airlines Center19890
| 15-11
|- bgcolor="#bbffbb"
| 27
| December 19
| Oklahoma City
| 
| Trevor Ariza (31)
| Chuck Hayes (15)
| Trevor Ariza (6)
| Toyota Center15095
| 16-11
|- bgcolor="#bbffbb"
| 28
| December 22
| LA Clippers
| 
| Aaron Brooks (27)
| Shane Battier (8)
| Kyle Lowry (7)
| Toyota Center17128
| 17-11
|- bgcolor="#ffcccc"
| 29
| December 23
| @ Orlando
| 
| Carl Landry (20)
| Trevor Ariza (7)
| Brooks, Battier (4)
| Amway Arena17461
| 17-12
|- bgcolor="#bbffbb"
| 30
| December 26
| @ New Jersey
| 
| Carl Landry (26)
| Trevor Ariza (11)
| Trevor Ariza (8)
| IZOD Center13374
| 18-12
|- bgcolor="#ffcccc"
| 31
| December 27
| @ Cleveland
| 
| Aaron Brooks (23)
| Carl Landry (6)
| Battier, Ariza, Brooks, Lowry (3)
| Quicken Loans Arena20562
| 18-13
|- bgcolor="#bbffbb"
| 32
| December 29
| New Orleans
| 
| Aaron Brooks (27)
| Luis Scola (12)
| Kyle Lowry (7)
| Toyota Center18187
| 19-13
|- bgcolor="#bbffbb"
| 33
| December 31
| Dallas
| 
| Aaron Brooks (30)
| Luis Scola (13)
| Trevor Ariza (7)
| Toyota Center18306
| 20-13

|- bgcolor="#ffcccc"
| 34
| January 2
| @ New Orleans
| 
| Trevor Ariza (19)
| Chuck Hayes (13)
| Kyle Lowry (6)
| New Orleans Arena16020
| 20-14
|- bgcolor="#ffcccc"
| 35
| January 5
| @ LA Lakers
| 
| Carl Landry (19)
| Carl Landry (6)
| Trevor Ariza (8)
| Staples Center18997
| 20-15
|- bgcolor="#ffcccc"
| 36
| January 6
| @ Phoenix
| 
| Aaron Brooks (34)
| Carl Landry (10)
| Kyle Lowry (6)
| US Airways Center15811
| 20-16
|- bgcolor="#bbffbb"
| 37
| January 9
| NY Knicks
| 
| Luis Scola (23)
| Scola, Lowry (7)
| Shane Battier (5)
| Toyota Center15693
| 21-16
|- bgcolor="#ffcccc"
| 38
| January 12
| @ Charlotte
| 
| Trevor Ariza (19)
| Luis Scola (14)
| Aaron Brooks (6)
| Time Warner Cable Arena11463
| 21-17
|- bgcolor="bbffbb"
| 39
| January 13
| Minnesota
| 
| Aaron Brooks (43)
| Chuck Hayes (17)
| Trevor Ariza (7)
| Toyota Center15175
| 22-17
|- bgcolor="#ffcccc"
| 40
| January 15
| Miami
| 
| Budinger, Scola (17)
| Battier, Ariza (6)
| Aaron Brooks (5)
| Toyota Center16720
| 22-18
|- bgcolor="#bbffbb"
| 41
| January 18
| Milwaukee
| 
| Luis Scola (27)
| Luis Scola (15)
| Aaron Brooks (10)
| Toyota Center17187
| 23-18
|- bgcolor="#bbffbb"
| 42
| January 22
| @ San Antonio
| 
| Brooks, Lowry (23)
| Luis Scola (9)
| Kyle Lowry (9)
| AT&T Center18581
| 24-18
|- bgcolor="#ffcccc"
| 43
| January 23
| Chicago
| 
| Carl Landry (22)
| Shane Battier (8)
| Kyle Lowry (5)
| Toyota Center18119
| 24-19
|- bgcolor="#ffcccc"
| 44
| January 25
| Atlanta
| 
| Carl Landry (16)
| Luis Scola (8)
| Aaron Brooks (5)
| Toyota Center14998
| 24-20
|- bgcolor="#ffcccc"
| 45
| January 27
| Denver
| 
| Aaron Brooks (22)
| Luis Scola (11)
| Kyle Lowry (7)
| Toyota Center16357
| 24-21
|- bgcolor="#bbffbb"
| 46
| January 29
| Portland
| 
| Aaron Brooks (33)
| Battier, Scola (8)
| Aaron Brooks (7)
| Toyota Center16129
| 25-21
|- bgcolor="#ffcccc"
| 47
| January 31
| Phoenix
| 
| Aaron Brooks (24)
| Shane Battier (11)
| Aaron Brooks (6)
| Toyota Center17165
| 25-22

 
|- bgcolor="#bbffbb"
| 48
| February 2
| Golden State
| 
| Brooks, Landry (24)
| Chuck Hayes (13)
| Aaron Brooks (6)
| Toyota Center12845
| 26-22
|- bgcolor="#bbffbb"
| 49
| February 5
| @ Memphis
| 
| Aaron Brooks (19)
| Joey Dorsey (12)
| Brooks, Lowry (4)
| FedExForum14531
| 27-22
|- bgcolor="#ffcccc"
| 50
| February 6
| Philadelphia
| 
| Aaron Brooks (34)
| Carl Landry (10)
| Ariza, Brooks (4)
| Toyota Center17415
| 27-23
|- bgcolor="#ffcccc"
| 51
| February 9
| @ Miami
| 
| Luis Scola (12)
| Hayes, Budinger (12)
| Battier, Scola (2)
| American Airlines Arena18654
| 27-24
|- bgcolor="#ffcccc"
| 52
| February 16
| Utah
| 
| Aaron Brooks (18)
| Shane Battier (8)
| Trevor Ariza (6)
| Toyota Center14942
| 27-25
|- bgcolor="#bbffbb"
| 53
| February 17
| @ Milwaukee
| 
| Trevor Ariza (22)
| Shane Battier (10)
| Aaron Brooks (12)
| Bradley Center11685
| 28-25
|- bgcolor="#ffcccc"
| 54
| February 20
| Indiana
| 
| Aaron Brooks (26)
| Scola, Andersen (11)
| Aaron Brooks (7)
| Toyota Center16550
| 28-26
|- bgcolor="#ffcccc"
| 55
| February 21
| @ New Orleans
| 
| Chase Budinger (18)
| Luis Scola (11)
| Brooks, Ariza (8)
| New Orleans Arena14504
| 28-27
|- bgcolor="#ffcccc"
| 56
| February 24
| Orlando
| 
| Aaron Brooks (24)
| Shane Battier (9)
| Aaron Brooks (8)
| Toyota Center15749
| 28-28
|- bgcolor="#bbffbb"
| 57
| February 26
| San Antonio
| 
| Kevin Martin (33)
| Luis Scola (13)
| Shane Battier (5)
| Toyota Center18195
| 29-28
|- bgcolor="#ffcccc"
| 58
| February 27
| @ Utah
| 
| Kevin Martin (32)
| Budinger, Hayes (5)
| Chuck Hayes (6)
| EnergySolutions Arena19911
| 29-29

 
|- bgcolor="#bbffbb"
| 59
| March 1
| Toronto
| 
| Martin, Brooks (28) 
| Luis Scola (8)
| Chuck Hayes (8)
| Toyota Center13943
| 30-29
|- bgcolor="#ffcccc"
| 60
| March 3
| Sacramento
| 
| Aaron Brooks (22)
| Luis Scola (18)
| Luis Scola (5)
| Toyota Center15651
| 30-30
|- bgcolor="#bbffbb"
| 61
| March 6
| @ Minnesota
| 
| Kevin Martin (30)
| Luis Scola (21)
| Aaron Brooks (9)
| Target Center15587
| 31-30
|- bgcolor="#ffcccc"
| 62
| March 7
| @ Detroit
| 
| Kevin Martin (27)
| Luis Scola (15)
| Aaron Brooks (7)
| Palace of Auburn Hills18422
| 31-31
|- bgcolor="#bbffbb"
| 63
| March 9
| @ Washington
| 
| Luis Scola (23)
| Luis Scola (10)
| Kyle Lowry (4)
| Verizon Center10422
| 32-31
|- bgcolor="#bbffbb"
| 64
| March 13
| New Jersey
| 
| Luis Scola (44)
| Luis Scola (12)
| Aaron Brooks (7)
| Toyota Center16998
| 33-31
|- bgcolor="#bbffbb"
| 65
| March 15
| Denver
|  
| Aaron Brooks (31)
| Luis Scola (11)
| Aaron Brooks (9)
| Toyota Center16369
| 34-31
|- bgcolor="#bbffbb"
| 66
| March 17
| Memphis
| 
| Aaron Brooks (33)
| Jordan Hill (9)
| Brooks, Battier, Lowry (4)
| Toyota Center16142
| 35-31
|- bgcolor="#ffcccc"
| 67
| March 19
| Boston
| 
| Scola, Martin (17)
| Luis Scola (10)
| Scola, Martin, Brooks, Lowry (3)
| Toyota Center18198
| 35-32
|- bgcolor="#bbffbb"
| 68
| March 21
| @ NY Knicks
| 
| Kevin Martin (28)
| Trevor Ariza (7)
| Trevor Ariza (6)
| Madison Square Garden17242
| 36-32
|- bgcolor="#ffcccc"
| 69
| March 22
| @ Chicago
| 
| Luis Scola (22)
| Luis Scola (10)
| Aaron Brooks (6)
| United Center19834
| 36-33
|- bgcolor="#ffcccc"
| 70
| March 24
| @ Oklahoma City
| 
| Luis Scola (25)
| Mike Harris (8)
| Aaron Brooks (7)
| Ford Center18203
| 36-34
|- bgcolor="#ffcccc"
| 71
| March 25
| LA Clippers
| 
| Brooks, Ariza (18)
| Luis Scola (14)
| Aaron Brooks (9)
| Toyota Center15201
| 36-35
|- bgcolor="#ffcccc"
| 72
| March 27
| LA Lakers
| 
| Luis Scola (28)
| Luis Scola (10)
| Aaron Brooks (7)
| Toyota Center18583
| 36-36
|- bgcolor="#bbffbb"
| 73
| March 30
| Washington
| 
| Chase Budinger (24)
| Scola, Brooks (8)
| Aaron Brooks (11)
| Toyota Center14395
| 37-36
|- bgcolor="#ffcccc"
| 74
| March 31
| @ San Antonio
| 
| Aaron Brooks (21)
| Jermaine Taylor (10)
| Kyle Lowry (5)
| AT&T Center18581
| 37-37

 
|- bgcolor="#bbffbb"
| 75
| April 2
| @ Boston
| 
| Aaron Brooks (30)
| Luis Scola (11)
| Aaron Brooks (9)
| TD Garden18624
| 38-37
|- bgcolor="#ffcccc"
| 76
| April 4
| @ Indiana
| 
| Chase Budinger (17)
| Luis Scola (6)
| Aaron Brooks (5)
| Conseco Fieldhouse14201
| 38-38
|- bgcolor="#bbffbb"
| 77
| April 6
| @ Memphis
| 
| Kevin Martin (29)
| Jared Jeffries (10)
| Aaron Brooks (7)
| FedExForum11673
| 39-38
|- bgcolor="#bbffbb"
| 78
| April 7
| Utah
| 
| Martin, Brooks (28)
| Chuck Hayes (18)
| Brooks, Lowry (5)
| Toyota Center15004
| 40-38
|- bgcolor="#bbffbb"
| 79
| April 9
| Charlotte
| 
| Aaron Brooks (23)
| Ariza, Scola (9)
| Trevor Ariza (8)
| Toyota Center16488
| 41-38
|- bgcolor="#ffcccc"
| 80
| April 11
| @ Phoenix
| 
| Luis Scola (30)
| Scola, Hayes (8)
| Aaron Brooks (6)
| US Airways Center18422
| 41-39
|- bgcolor="#bbffbb"
| 81
| April 12
| @ Sacramento
| 
| Kevin Martin (39)
| Hayes, Jeffries (7)
| Kyle Lowry (11)
| ARCO Arena14549
| 42-39
|- bgcolor="#ffcccc"
| 82
| April 14
| New Orleans
| 
| Trevor Ariza (26)
| Trevor Ariza (10)
| Trevor Ariza (10)
| Toyota Center18191
| 42-40

Player statistics

Regular season

|-
| 
| 63 || 0 || 14.1 || .432 || .346 || .687 || 3.3 || .7 || .2 || .2 || 5.8
|-
| 
| 72 || 71 || style=";"| 36.5 || .394 || .334 || .649 || 5.6 || 3.8 || style=";"| 1.8 || .6 || 14.9
|-
| 
| 9 || 0 || 4.4 || .294 || .000 || .000 || .7 || .3 || .6 || .0 || 1.1
|-
| 
| 67 || 62 || 32.4 || .398 || .362 || .726 || 4.7 || .8 || .8 || style=";"| 1.1 || 8.0
|-
| 
| style=";"| 82 || style=";"| 82 || 35.6 || .432 || .398 || .822 || 2.6 || style=";"| 5.3 || .8 || .2 || 19.6
|-
| 
| 74 || 4 || 20.1 || .441 || .369 || .770 || 3.0 || 1.2 || .5 || .1 || 8.9
|-
| 
| 5 || 0 || 7.2 || .300 || .300 || .000 || .6 || 1.4 || .0 || .0 || 1.2
|-
| 
| 15 || 0 || 2.9 || .304 || .222 || .714 || .6 || .1 || .0 || .1 || 1.4
|-
| 
| 7 || 0 || 7.7 || .455 || . || .500 || 3.6 || .3 || .3 || .1 || 1.6
|-
| 
| 8 || 0 || 10.3 || .370 || .000 || .556 || 2.5 || .4 || .5 || .1 || 3.1
|-
| 
| style=";"| 82 || style=";"| 82 || 21.6 || .489 || . || .545 ||  5.7 || 1.7 || .9 || .5 || 4.4
|-
| 
| 23 || 0 || 16.2 || .532 || . || .660 || 5.0 || .6 || .2 || .5 || 6.4
|-
| 
| 18 || 0 || 18.4 || .429 || .111 || .556 || 3.6 || 1.0 || .5 || .7 || 4.9
|-
| 
| 52 || 1 || 27.2 || style=";"| .547 || . || .839 || 5.5 || .8 || .5 || .9 || 16.1
|-
| 
| 68 || 0 || 24.3 || .397 || .272 || .827 || 3.6 || 4.5 || .9 || .1 || 9.1
|-
| 
| 24 || 22 || 35.8 || .435 || .310 || style=";"| .924 || 2.9 || 2.3 || 1.0 || .1 || style=";"| 21.3
|-
| 
| 6 || 0 || 7.7 || .368 || style=";"| .500 || .667 || .8 || 1.0 || .0 || .3 || 3.2
|-
| 
| 4 || 0 || 3.3 || .250 || . || .500 || 1.0 || .3 || .3 || .3 || 1.3
|-
| 
| style=";"| 82 || style=";"| 82 || 32.6 || .514 || .200 || .779 || style=";"| 8.6 || 2.1 || .8 || .3 || 16.2
|-
| 
| 31 || 4 || 9.8 || .378 || .227 || .717 || 1.5 || .5 || .3 || .1 || 4.1
|-
| 
| 9 || 0 || 13.1 || .448 || .250 || .667 || 1.6 || .8 || .4 || .4 || 5.0
|}

Awards, records and milestones

Awards

Week/Month

All-Star

Season
Aaron Brooks, NBA Most Improved Player Award

Records

Milestones

Injuries and surgeries
Yao Ming missed the entire season with a stress fracture in his left ankle.

Transactions

Trades

Free agents

References

External links
 2009–10 Houston Rockets season at ESPN
2009–10 Houston Rockets season at Basketball Reference

Houston Rockets seasons
Houston